The Ahmedabad Spinning and Weaving Company Ltd. was the first textile mill and garments company established in Ahmedabad and one of the first textile mills of India. It was opened on 30 May 1861, and started by entrepreneur, Ranchhodlal Chhotalal.

References

Manufacturing companies based in Ahmedabad
1861 establishments in British India
Textile industry in Gujarat
Defunct textile companies of India
Indian companies established in 1861